The Nanticoke Solar Facility is a 44 MW solar power station in Nanticoke, Ontario, Canada. It is located on the site of the defunct Nanticoke Generating Station, which operated from 1972 to 2013 and was the largest coal-fired power plant in North America. 

The facility is owned and operated by Nanticoke Solar LP, a joint venture of Ontario Power Generation (80%), the Six Nations of the Grand River Development Corporation (15%), and the Mississaugas of the Credit First Nation (5%).

History

The Nanticoke Solar Facility and its predecessor, the Nanticoke Generating Station, is built on the site of the "Battle of Nanticoke" where the Norfolk volunteer militia routed a band of American marauders who had been pillaging area farms and terrorizing the country in 1813. The site was designated a National Historic Site of Canada in 1924. Following the phase-out of coal power in the province, Ontario Power Generation announced in July 2015 that it would not be converting the facility to biomass or natural gas and that remaining equipment would be sold or repurposed elsewhere. The two smokestacks were imploded using controlled demolition on February 28, 2018. 

OPG established Nanticoke Solar LP as a joint venture with First Nations to build and operate a new solar facility on the site. The Nanticoke Solar Facility is Ontario Power Generation's first solar facility. Contracts were let in 2016 and construction began in 2018. The 192,000-panel solar farm was completed in March 2019 but demolition of the old Nanticoke GS structures continued even after construction was completed. The last sections of the former Nanticoke GS were demolished on August 22, 2019.

See also 

 List of power stations in Canada
 Science and technology in Canada

References

External links
 

Ontario Power Generation
Buildings and structures in Haldimand County
Energy infrastructure completed in 2019
Joint ventures
2019 establishments in Ontario
Solar power stations in Ontario